Women's 50 metre rifle three positions (then known as standard rifle) was one of the fifteen shooting events at the 1996 Summer Olympics. Renata Mauer, who had won the air rifle competitions a few days earlier, set a new Olympic record of 589 points in the qualification round, but failed to win the double as she was surpassed in the final by Aleksandra Ivošev, winning on the final Olympic record score of 686.1, and Irina Gerasimenok.

Qualification round

OR Olympic record – Q Qualified for final

Final

OR Olympic record

References

Sources

Shooting at the 1996 Summer Olympics
Olymp
Women's events at the 1996 Summer Olympics
Women's 050m 3 positions 1996